is a Japanese anime director. He is best known for directing the 2015 anime, Charlotte. Asai also featured as a guest at Anime Festival Asia 2015.

Works

Banner of the Stars (2000) - Key Animation (episode 7)
Ah! My Goddess (2005) - Storyboard (episodes 11, 16, 22), Episode Direction (episodes 5, 11, 16, 22)
Ah! My Goddess: Flights of Fancy (2006) - Storyboard (episodes 12, 19), Episodes Director (5, 12, 19)
Aria: The Natural (2006) - Episode Director (episode 5)
Angel Beats (2010) - Storyboard (episode 5)
Charlotte (2015) - Series Director
Fate/Apocrypha (2017) - Series Director
The Day I Became a God (2020) - Series Director
Buddy Daddies (2023) - Series Director

References

Living people
Anime directors
Year of birth missing (living people)